Cheshmeh Sefid-e Shobankareh (also Romanized as Cheshmeh Sefīd-e Shobānkāreh; also known as Cheshmeh Sefīd) is a village in Dowlatabad Rural District, in the Central District of Ravansar County, Kermanshah Province, Iran. At the 2006 census, its population was 124, in 31 families.

References 

Populated places in Ravansar County